László Székely (1910 – 29 November 1969) was a Hungarian footballer and football manager.

Székely is best known for winning the 1960–61 Turkish National League with Fenerbahçe.

Managerial career
Székely had a brief playing career as a midfielder, before travelling around the world coaching teams in different countries.  Székely was briefly the manager of both the Israeli and Turkish national football teams. A journeyman, Székely managed several teams in Italy, Brazil, Austria, and Turkey before dying in an untimely car accident on 29 November 1969.

Honours

Managerial
Fenerbahçe
 Turkish National League: 1960-1961

References

External links
Mackolik Profile

Spor.De Profile

1910 births
1969 deaths
Footballers from Budapest
Hungarian footballers
Association football midfielders
CA Oradea players
MTK Budapest FC players
Nemzeti Bajnokság I players
Hungarian football managers
SC Hakoah Wien managers
U.S. Lecce managers
Clube Atlético Juventus managers
Hellas Verona F.C. managers
Israel national football team managers
Fenerbahçe football managers
Galatasaray S.K. (football) managers
Grêmio Foot-Ball Porto Alegrense managers
Turkey national football team managers
Vefa S.K. managers
Palermo F.C. managers
U.S. Alessandria Calcio 1912 managers
Süper Lig managers
Serie B managers
Hungarian expatriate football managers
Hungarian expatriate sportspeople in Austria
Hungarian expatriate sportspeople in Italy
Hungarian expatriate sportspeople in Brazil
Hungarian expatriate sportspeople in Israel
Hungarian expatriate sportspeople in Turkey
Expatriate football managers in Austria
Expatriate football managers in Italy
Expatriate football managers in Brazil
Expatriate football managers in Israel
Expatriate football managers in Turkey
Road incident deaths in Italy